An echo is a reflection of sound. 

Echo may also refer to:

Mythology
 Echo (mythology), a nymph in Greek mythology, for whom the sound reflection phenomenon was named.

Arts, entertainment, and media

Fictional entities
 Echo (DC Comics), various different characters
 Echo (Dollhouse), the protagonist of the TV series Dollhouse
 Echo (Marvel Comics), a superheroine in the Marvel Comics
 Maya Lopez (Marvel Cinematic Universe), the Marvel Cinematic Universe counterpart
 Echo, a race of aliens from the TV series Invasion: Earth
 Echo DiSavoy, a character in the soap opera One Life to Live
 Echo Nightray, a character in Pandora Hearts, a manga series
 Echo, an ARC clone trooper from the Star Wars: The Clone Wars TV series and Star Wars: The Bad Batch TV series

Films
 The Echo (1915 film), an American silent short romantic drama directed by Tom Ricketts
 Echo (1997 film), a TV film
 Echo (2001 film), an Iranian drama by Hossein Shahabi
 Echo (2003 film), a short film by Tom Oesch
Sigaw, a 2004 Filipino horror film, released internationally as The Echo
 Echo (2007 film), a Danish film
 The Echo (2008 film), a horror film based on the Filipino film
 Echo (2019 film), an Icelandic film by Rúnar Rúnarsson

Television
 Echo (TV series), an upcoming Disney+ series based on the Marvel Comics character
 "Echo" (Dollhouse episode), an unaired pilot episode
 "Echo" (The Americans), a 2014 episode
 Echo TV, a conservative Hungarian TV channel

Radio
 Echo (radio station), a community radio station in Farnborough, Hampshire
 Echo of Moscow, a Russian radio station

Literature
 Echo (comic book), a comic book title by Terry Moore, launched in 2008
 Echo (Block novel), a 2000 fantasy novel by Francesca Lia Block
 Echo (Muñoz Ryan novel), a 2015 novel by Pam Muñoz Ryan
 "Echo", a poem by Christina Rossetti
 The Echo (novel), a 1997 crime novel by Minette Walters
 The Echo, a novel by Giles A. Lutz
 "The Echo" (short story), a 1946 short story by Paul Bowles

Newspapers and magazines 
 Echo (newspaper), a list of newspapers called Echo or The Echo
 The Echo (Cork newspaper), founded in 1892 in Cork, Ireland
 The Echo (Dublin newspaper), based in Dublin, Ireland
 The Echo (Essex), a daily newspaper in England
 The Echo (London) (1868–1905), an evening newspaper in England

Online media
 Echo (blog comment hosting service), a blog comment hosting service
 EchoNYC, an online community
 Early Cinema History Online, silent films database

Music

Classical compositions
 Echo, by Iván Madarász
 Echo, by Hindemith
 Echo, by Respighi
 Echo, by Lord Henry Somerset
 Echo, by Helen Jane Long
 The Echo, a 1925 opera by Frank Patterson, featuring soprano Marie Rappold and tenor Forrest Lamont
 Echo (ballet), a ballet by Peter Martins

Albums
 Echo (Dave Burrell album) (1969)
 Echo (Tom Petty and the Heartbreakers album) (1999)
 Echo (Leona Lewis album) (2009)
 Echo (Nothing's Carved in Stone album) (2011)
 Echo, a 2013 album by Laura Sheeran
 Echo Echo (disambiguation)

Songs
 "Echo" (Ciara song)
 "Echo" (Elevation Worship song), 2018
 "Echo" (Girls Can't Catch song), 2010
 "Echo" (Gorilla Zoe song), from Don't Feed Da Animals
 "Echo" (Hardwell song) featuring Jonathan Mendelsohn, 2015, from United We Are
 "Echo" (Mileo song), 2014
 "Echo" (R. Kelly song), 2009, from Untitled
 "Echo" (Trapt song)
 "Echo" (You and I), by Anggun
 "Echo", a song by Maroon 5 from Jordi
 "Echo", a song by Eskimo Joe from Ghosts of the Past
 "Echo", a song by Cyndi Lauper from Bring Ya to the Brink
 "Echo", a song by Bad Meets Evil (Eminem & Royce Da 5'9), from Hell: The Sequel
 "Echo", a song by Foxes, from Glorious
 "Echo", a song by Joe Satriani from Surfing with the Alien
 "Echo", a song by The Mekons from The Mekons Rock 'n Roll

Other uses in music
 Echo (producer), reggaeton producer
 Echo Music Prize, a German music award
 The Echo Label, a record label
 Echo, an alias of English group Way Out West
 Echos, a music duo from "Cold Skin" (Seven Lions and Echos song)

Video games 
 Echo: Secrets of the Lost Cavern, a 2005 video game
 Echo (2017 video game), a stealth and action-adventure video game

Brands and enterprises
 Amazon Echo, a line of smart speakers by Amazon.com
 Echo Arena Liverpool, a music venue
 ECHO Lake Aquarium and Science Center, in Burlington, Vermont
 Echo smartpen, a ballpoint pen, computer and audio recorder manufactured by Livescribe
 Echo tools, a series of power tools manufactured by the Yamabiko Corporation
 Kyocera Echo, a dual screen smart phone
 The Echo (venue), an American music venue and nightclub, Los Angeles, California
 Toyota Yaris, previously known as the Toyota Echo, a sub-compact car

Computing
 echo (command), a Unix, DOS and Microsoft Windows command to display a line of text
 Echo (computing), a feature of telecommunications protocols
 Echo (framework), a web framework for Java programming
 Echo, a command in programming languages to output one or more strings
 Echo, a discussion forum on FidoNet
 ECHO IV, "Electronic Computer for Home Operation", an experimental home computer from 1966
 Echo Protocol, an Internet protocol largely superseded by ICMP
 Echo (communications protocol), a group communications protocol for authenticated and encrypted information

People
 Aimee Echo, American vocalist with TheStart and Normandie
 Echo Eggebrecht (born 1977), American painter
 Echo Heron, American author and activist
 Echo Johnson, model and actress
 Echo Kellum (born 1982), American actor and comedian

Places
 Echo Bay (disambiguation), several places in the United States and Canada
 Echo Canyon (disambiguation), several places with this name
 Echo Lake (disambiguation), several places in the United States and Canada

United States
 Echo, Alabama, an unincorporated community
 Echo, Inyo County, California, a former settlement
 Echo Mountain, in the San Gabriel Mountains, California
 Echo Peak, in the Sierra Nevada range, California
 Echo, Kentucky, an unincorporated community
 Echo, Louisiana, an unincorporated community
 Echo, Minnesota, a city
 Echo, Oregon, a city
 Echo, Pennsylvania, an unincorporated community
 Echo, Utah, a census-designated place
 Echo, Texas
 Echo, West Virginia, an unincorporated community
 Echo Peak (Wyoming), a mountain peak in the Gallatin Range in Yellowstone National Park
 Echo Summit, a mountain pass in California
 Echo Township, Michigan
 Echo Township, Yellow Medicine County, Minnesota
 Lake Echo (Polk County, Florida)

Elsewhere
 Echo, Aragón, Spain, a village
 Echo, Ontario, a neighbourhood in West Lincoln, Canada
 60 Echo, an asteroid
 Echo Bank, a submarine mountain in the Atlantic Ocean

Science
 Echo (damselfly), a genus of damselfly
 Echocardiography, an imaging technique used to assess heart function in medicine
 Echovirus, short for "enteric cytopathic human orphan" virus
 EChO, a proposed European Space Agency mission to study exoplanet atmospheres
 ECHO Clearinghouse, NASA's registry of Earth Science data and services, an early SOA example
 Project Echo, the first passive communications satellite experiment
 Signal reflection, in electronics

Transport

Aircraft
 Echo, the name of an Armstrong Whitworth Ensign aircraft
 Cosmos Echo, an ultralight trike aircraft
 Tecnam P92 Echo, an ultralight aircraft

Marine vessels
 Echo 12, a Canadian sailboat design.
  was a ship launched at Hull in 1792 that made one voyage for the British East India Company and that was captured by a French privateer in 1799
 Echo (steam tug), a steam tug on Puget Sound
 Echo (sternwheeler 1865), a sternwheel steamboat that operated on the Willamette River, in Oregon, U.S.
 Echo (sternwheeler 1901), a sternwheel steamboat that operated on the Coquille River, in Oregon, U.S.
 Echo-class submarine, a Soviet-era submarine class
 Echo-class survey ship (1957), a Royal Navy class
 Echo-class survey ship (2002), a Royal Navy class
 , various Royal Navy ships
 USS Echo (IX-95), a 1942 US Army World War II supply ship

Motor vehicles
 Toyota Echo, rebadged variant of the Toyota Yaris, produced between 1999 through 2005

Other uses
 ECHO (European Commission) (European Community Humanitarian aid Office), a department of the European Union
 Echo (mythology), a nymph
 Echo (elephant), a matriarch elephant in the Amboseli National Park
 Echo, the letter E in the ICAO spelling alphabet
 ECHO, acronym for Extended Care Health Option, a health coverage program
 ECHO, acronym for East Coast Homophile Organizations
 Echo, triple parentheses around a name as a symbol of antisemitism
 Echo effect, electronic echo

See also

 Echoes (disambiguation)
 Camp Echo (disambiguation)
 Daily Echo (disambiguation)
 Echo II (disambiguation)
 Echo School (disambiguation)
 
 Eco (disambiguation)
 Ecco (disambiguation)
 Eko (disambiguation)
 Ekko (disambiguation)
 Eckō Unltd., a clothing brand
 EKCO, a British electronics company